Thenae or Thenai was a town of ancient Crete close on the Omphalian Plain, and near Cnossus. William Smith, writing in the 19th century, says it must have been close to the Temenos Fortress which was built in 961, when the Emirate of Crete was vanquished by Nicephorus Phocas and the forces of the Byzantine Emperor. However, modern scholars treat its site as unlocated.

References

Populated places in ancient Crete
Former populated places in Greece
Lost ancient cities and towns